The 1976 East Coast Conference men's basketball tournament was held March 1–6, 1976.  The champion gained and an automatic berth to the NCAA tournament.

Bracket and results

* denotes overtime game

References

East Coast Conference (Division I) men's basketball tournament
Tournament
East Coast Conference (Division I) men's basketball tournament
College basketball tournaments in Pennsylvania
Basketball competitions in Philadelphia
East Coast Conference (Division I) Men's Basketball Tournament, 1976
ECC men's basketball tournament